The Canberra Lakers (for sponsorship reasons referred to as Canberra Labor Club Lakers) are an Australian hockey team based in Canberra, Australian Capital Territory that play in the Australian Hockey League.

External links
Official website

Australian field hockey clubs
Field hockey clubs established in 1991
Lak
1991 establishments in Australia